Menteath is a surname. Notable people with the surname include:

 Andrew Agnew Stuart Menteath (1853–1916), New Zealand politician
 Charles Granville Stuart Menteath (1769–1847), Scottish advocate and landowner
 James Menteath (c.1718–1802), Scottish cleric
 James Stuart Menteath (1792–1870), Scottish advocate and amateur geologist